Cayucas, previously Oregon Bike Trails, is an American indie pop band from Santa Monica, California. The group includes Zach Yudin and his twin brother Ben Yudin on guitar. The band signed to Secretly Canadian in 2012.

History

2011: Oregon Bike Trails
Zach Yudin, then a musician for nearly five years, posted his first song under the name Oregon Bike Trails on January 18, 2011. He was associated with Father/Daughter Records in the early part of his career.

2012: Secretly Canadian
In 2012, Yudin expanded from a solo project to a band and he officially changed the group's name from Oregon Bike Trails to Cayucas. Cayucas signed with indie record label Secretly Canadian in October 2012, and soon after released a single, "Swimsuit," and announced a tour with Ra Ra Riot for February 2013.

2013: Bigfoot
In February 2013, Cayucas announced a handful of European tour dates. In March, the band performed in a Secretly Canadian showcase at South by Southwest. Their debut full-length album Bigfoot, was released on April 30 by Secretly Canadian. The album was produced by fellow Secretly Canadian artist Richard Swift.

2015: Dancing at the Blue Lagoon
The single "Moony Eyed Walrus" was released by Secretly Canadian on April 29, 2015, ahead of the sophomore album entitled Dancing at the Blue Lagoon, out June 23, 2015. The band enlisted Ryan Hadlock to engineer and produce the record. Davey Brozowski played drums and percussion on the record while Mat Santos and Rebecca Zeller of Ra Ra Riot played bass and strings.

2019: Real Life
The band's third album Real Life was released on April 19, 2019, and was preceded by the single "Jessica WJ".

2020: Blue Summer
The band's fourth album, preceded with singles "Yeah Yeah Yeah" & "California Girl"

Discography

Studio albums

Singles

References

External links
 Official website
 Cayucas at Secretly Canadian
 
 

Indie pop groups from California
Musical groups from California
Secretly Canadian artists